Richmond School District (School District No. 38) is a school district based in Richmond, British Columbia, Canada.

The school board serves the city of Richmond.

Schools
As of 2016 the district has 38 primary schools, 10 secondary schools, and one alternative school. The Richmond School District (SD38) believes in a hands on learning approach and is less worried about the grades of their students, but rather the actual skills of their students.

Elementary schools

Secondary schools
Prior to 1996, Richmond had separate Junior Secondary Schools (grades 8–10) and Senior Secondary Schools (grades 11–12). Starting in 1996, the district began a two-year merging process that changed all high schools to be Grades 8 to 12 inclusive.

Alternate schools
Station Stretch
Richmond Virtual School

School reports - Ministry of Education
 Class Size
 Satisfaction Survey
 School Performance
 Skills Assessment

Board of Education 
The Richmond Board of Education consists of seven school trustees. They are elected along with the mayor and councillors of Richmond in municipal elections.

2022–present 
Elected in the 2022 municipal election 
 Rob Belleza
 Ken Hamaguchi
 Heather Larson
 Donna Sargent
 Debbie Tablotney
 Alice Wong
 David Yang

2018–2022 
Elected in the 2018 municipal election 
 Norm Goldstein
 Ken Hamaguchi
 Heather Larson
 Richard Lee
 Sandra Nixon
 Donna Sargent
 Debbie Tablotney

2014–2018  
Elected in the 2014 municipal election 
 Ken Hamaguchi
 Jonathan Ho
 Sandra Nixon
 Donna Sargent
 Debbie Tablotney
 Alice Wong
 Eric Yung

References

External links

 Richmond School District official website

Education in Richmond, British Columbia
School districts in British Columbia